Euphorbia smithii is a species of plant in the family Euphorbiaceae. It is found in Oman and Yemen. It is threatened by habitat loss.

References

smithii
Near threatened plants
Taxonomy articles created by Polbot